Michigan's 9th Senate district is one of 38 districts in the Michigan Senate. It has been represented by Republican Michael Webber since 2023, succeeding Democrat Paul Wojno.

Geography
District 9 encompasses parts of Macomb and Oakland counties.

2011 Apportionment Plan
District 9, as dictated by the 2011 Apportionment Plan, covered the inner suburbs of Detroit in southern Macomb County, including Warren, Roseville, Eastpointe, Fraser, Center Line, and part of Clinton Township.

The district was located entirely within Michigan's 9th congressional district, and overlapped with the 18th, 22nd, 25th, 28th, and 31st districts of the Michigan House of Representatives.

Recent election results

2018

2014

Federal and statewide results in District 9

Historical district boundaries

References 

9
Macomb County, Michigan